Maalai Pozhudhin Mayakathilaey is a 2012 Indian Tamil-language romance film written and directed by Narayan Nagendra Rao. It stars Aari Arujunan and Shubha Phutela, with Subbu Panchu, R. S. Shivaji, and Balaji Venugopal in other pivotal roles. The soundtrack and background score was composed by Achu, while the film was produced by Mayuri Sekar.

Cast 

Aari Arujunan as Ajay
Shubha Phutela as Jiya
Subbu Panchu as Manager
R. S. Shivaji as Writer
Balaji Venugopal as Satish
Sathish as Tarun
Karunakaran as Sampath
Tejasvini as Ramya
Vishal as Vishnu
Hari as Hari
Radha Manallan as Paarthi
Ashwathy Warrier (guest appearance in a song 'Oh Baby Girl')
Nandha (guest appearance in a song 'Oh Baby Girl')

Production 
In February 2010, the makers of Maalai Pozhudhin Mayakathilaey (MPM) announced that they were going to host auditions to select a heroine and a road show was subsequently held for two days around colleges and popular hangouts in Chennai. In March 2010, details about the project became more clear and it was announced that a team of five assistant directors were to come together to produce a film, setting a company up named 'Team AD'. It was revealed that the story is about the happenings that take place in just 2.5 hours, mentioning that the story starts at 6.30 pm, exactly when the show starts at a theatre, and ends at 9 pm, when the show ends. The five-member team — Narayanan, Arun, Sakthi, Manoj and Subash — decided that Narayanan would be the director. It was announced that Adith Arun, who played the lead role in Katha (2009) and Inidhu Inidhu (2010), would be paired opposite Regina Cassandra, who played the sister of Laila in Kanda Naal Mudhal. The film was expected to be shot and released by May 2010 but eventually failed to proceed so swiftly.

The film re-emerged in October 2011 where it was announced that the lead roles were being played by Aari Arujunan of Rettaisuzhi fame and winner of Miss South India 2010, Shubha Phutela; while production was taken over by Mayuri Sekar. The actress had to learn Tamil, and it took her over two months of practice to get the pronunciation right. The director wanted to opt for live-sound recording, making it more difficult for the non-Tamil speaking actress. Shubha Phutela had to opt out of the Kannada film in February 2012, Jai Bhajarong Bali, choosing to give her priority dates to completing Maalai Pozhudhin Mayakathilaey. However, she died in October 2012 due to kidney problems. Aari mentioned that it was "really challenging to play an ordinary guy", as he had to consciously keep his emotions to a minimum at all times.

Soundtrack 
The soundtrack features nine songs composed by Achu, with lyrics by Rohini, Narayan Nagendra Rao and Achu himself. A single track for the film was expected to be launched in September 2011, it but did not happen. The soundtrack was launched on 15 February 2012, by Ameer, who used the platform to make controversial statements about the FEFSI strike of 2012. The event included other film personalities like Mysskin, Cheran, Balaji, Thamarai, and Prabhu Solomon.

Reception 
A reviewer from Sify.com wrote that Maalai Pozhudhin Mayakathilaey was "back breakingly long and turns out to be a boring affair", continuing to quote that the director had "tried out an experimental film which is preachy, monotonous and moves at snail pace". The Times of India critic M. Suganth called it a "largely uninteresting — and also a little pretentious — film that fails in execution, the chief culprit being the pacing". Behindwoods.com rated it 1.5/5, noting that it was "the weak script and slow pace of the movie that hampers the progress". The reviewer further criticized the "documentary feel throughout the film", the characterization as well as the "philosophical lines and preachy dialogues". Indiaglitz.com, too, found fault at the film's pace, although the background score by Achu and the cinematography by Gopi Amarnath were applauded. Rohit Ramachandran of Nowrunning.com rated it 1.5/5 concluding: "An eventful day in a coffee shop that turns into an uninteresting love-life seminar".

References 

2010s Tamil-language films
2012 films
2012 independent films
2012 romance films
Films scored by Achu Rajamani
Films set in Chennai
Indian independent films
Indian romance films